= Wang Ming (artist) =

Asian American artist

Wang Ming (1921–2016), also known as Ming Wang and Stone Man, was an Asian-American artist.

Wang's art is in the collections of the Smithsonian American Art Museum, the National Gallery of Art, and the Brooklyn Museum. In 2009, 35 of his works were exhibited in the Smithsonian's National Air and Space Museum making him the first Asian American artist whose art was featured in the museum's galleries.

== Early life ==
Wang was born in Tianjin, China, in 1921. He left China in 1939.

Wang worked as an air traffic controller in Taiwan in the 1940s and emigrated to the United States in 1951.

== Career ==
Upon arrival in the US, Wang opened a frame shop and made art. He often used acrylic paints, pellon fabric and Chinese calligraphy to create his works, much of which was celestial-inspired.

Two of Wang's pieces were purchased by the Smithsonian's National Air and Space Museum art collector, James Dean. In 2009, the museum hosted a solo exhibition of his work titled Universal Dimensions: The Space Art of Wang Ming.

== Death ==
Wang died in Bethesda, Maryland in 2016.
